= A Good Mom Is Better Than a Good Teacher =

Book by Yin Jianli

A Good Mom Is Better Than a Good Teacher is a Chinese language book by Yin Jianli. It goes into detail about how parents should listen to their children. It is in opposition to perceived trends where getting into the best schools is a parent's highest priority.

The material of the book, and its runaway success in China, was covered in The Wall Street Journal in 2010.
